Anna Mary Richards  (born 3 December 1964) is a former New Zealand rugby union player. She represented  at four World Cups — 1998, 2002, 2006, and 2010.

Richards played representative tennis and netball before debuting for the Black Ferns on 26 August 1990. She was a member of the first official New Zealand women's sevens team, who took part in the 2000 Hong Kong Sevens.

Richards played 54 matches for the Black Ferns of which 49 were full internationals. In the 2005 Queen's Birthday Honours, She was appointed a Member of the New Zealand Order of Merit, for services to women's rugby.

Richards was appointed as head coach of the Hong Kong women's sevens team in 2014. She was inducted into the IRB Hall of Fame on 17 November 2014. She also has a law degree and a BA. As at January 2023 she is the women's player development manager at Auckland Rugby.

References

External links 
 Black Ferns profile
 World Rugby Hall of Fame profile
 

1964 births
Living people
Rugby union players from Timaru
Members of the New Zealand Order of Merit
New Zealand women's international rugby union players
New Zealand women's international rugby sevens players
New Zealand female rugby union players
New Zealand rugby union coaches
Rugby union fly-halves